The 1978 Boston College Eagles football team represented Boston College as an independent during the 1978 NCAA Division I-A football season. The team compiled a 0–11 record and were outscored by a total of 294 to 153. The team compiled the worst record in Division I-A during the 1978 season. Five of the team's games were lost in late stages. The team traveled to Tokyo to play in the Mirage Bowl on December 10.

Ed Chlebek was hired as the team's head coach in January 1978, after having coached at Eastern Michigan for two years; he was named the Mid-America Conference coach of the year in 1977.

The team's statistical leaders included Jay Palazola with 926 passing yards, Anthony Brown with 748 rushing yards, and Paul McCarty with 531 receiving yards.

The team played its home games at Alumni Stadium in Chestnut Hill, Massachusetts.

Schedule

References

Boston College
Boston College Eagles football seasons
College football winless seasons
Boston College Eagles football
Boston College Eagles football